Soil Science Society of America Journal is a bimonthly peer-reviewed scientific journal publishing research on all aspects of soil science. It was established in 1937 as Soil Science Society of America Proceedings with J. D. Luckett as founding editor-in-chief. The journal obtained its current title in 1973. It is the flagship journal of the Soil Science Society of America and is published on their behalf by Wiley. As of 2013, the journal is only available online.

Articles undergo double-blind review, where authors and reviewers remain anonymous to one another. The editor-in-chief is William Horwath (University of California Davis).

Abstracting and indexing
The journal is abstracted and indexed in:

According to the Journal Citation Reports, the journal has a 2020 impact factor of 2.932.

References

External links

Publications established in 1937
English-language journals
Bimonthly journals
Soil science journals
Hybrid open access journals
Wiley (publisher) academic journals